The 1st Armoured Reconnaissance Brigade was a regular British Army unit during the Second World War.

History 
Formed in France in 1940 from the RAC Regiments from the regular divisions. The brigade saw action during the Battle of France. On 26 November 1940 it was converted into the 27th Armoured Brigade.

Order of Battle 
The Order of battle of the brigade during the war was: (day/month/year), units in order of precedence.

 4th/7th Royal Dragoon Guards 18/6/40–25/11/40
 13th/18th Royal Hussars 18/6/40–25/11/40
 The Fifeshire and Forfarshire Yeomanry (Dragoons) 7/4/40–17/6/40
 East Riding of Yorkshire Yeomanry (Lancers) 30/4/40–25/11/40

See also

 British Armoured formations of World War II
 List of British brigades of the Second World War

Notes

References
 

Military units and formations established in 1940
Armoured brigades of the British Army in World War II